Kanza is a name. Notable people with it include:

Given name

 Kanza Javed, Pakistani author and poet

Surname

 Daniel Kanza (1909–1990), Congolese politician
 Lokua Kanza (born 1958), Congolese singer-songwriter
 Sophie Kanza (1940–1999), Congolese politician and sociologist
 Thomas Kanza (1933–2004), Congolese diplomat

See also

 Dirty Kanza
 Kanza Bowl